Dimitriy Yurevich Timchenko (born 1 April 1983) is a Ukrainian Greco-Roman wrestler. He won a silver medal at the 2015 European Games and a bronze medal in the 2015 World Wrestling Championships.

He competed for Ukraine at the 2016 Summer Olympics.

References

External links
 
 
 
 
 

1983 births
Living people
Ukrainian male sport wrestlers
Olympic wrestlers of Ukraine
Wrestlers at the 2016 Summer Olympics
World Wrestling Championships medalists
European Games silver medalists for Ukraine
European Games medalists in wrestling
Wrestlers at the 2015 European Games
European Wrestling Championships medalists
20th-century Ukrainian people
21st-century Ukrainian people